Gallia Belgica was a province of the Roman Empire in present-day Belgium, Luxembourg, and the Netherlands.

Belgica may also refer to:

Places
 Belgica Glacier, Antarctica
 Belgica Guyot, an undersea tablemount off Antarctica
 Belgica Mountains, a mountain chain in Antarctica
 Belgica Subglacial Highlands, Antarctica
 Fort Belgica, a 17th-century fort in the Maluku Islands, Indonesia
 La Bélgica, a town in Bolivia
 Low Countries or Belgica
 Belgica Mound Province, an carbonate mound in the Porcupine Seabight

Ships
 RV Belgica (1884), a vessel that undertook the Belgian Antarctic Expedition
 RV Belgica (A962), a research vessel built in 1984

Other uses
 Belgica (film), a 2016 Belgian film
 Belgica (fly), a flightless midge genus of family Chironomidae
 Bélgica (Madrid Metro), a station on Line 2 of the Metro Ligero
 Belgica metro station, a station on Brussels Metro line 6, opened in 1982
 Fort Belgica, a 17th-century fort in Banda Neira, Indonesia
 1052 Belgica, an asteroid discovered in 1925
 Bela belgica, an extinct sea snail of family Mangeliidae
 Ulmus × hollandica 'Belgica', an elm variety popular throughout Belgium and the Netherlands in the 19th century
 Belgica, the digital library of the Royal Library of Belgium

People with the surname
 Greco Belgica (born 1978), Filipino politician and television host

People with the given name
 Bélgica Carmona Cabrera (born 1987), Mexican politician
 Bélgica Castro (born 1921), Chilean actress

See also
 Belgic (disambiguation)
 Belgica Foederata, the "federal Netherlands"
 Belgica Regia, the "king's Netherlands"
 Belgium
 K.V.V. Belgica Edegem Sport, a football club based in Edegem, Belgium
 SS Belgica, a list of steamships with the name
 Terminology of the Low Countries
 United Belgian States